John Connell Johnson (December 11, 1933 – October 18, 2015) was an American football defensive back in the National Football League for the Chicago Bears. He also was a member of the Buffalo Bills and Dallas Texans in the American Football League. He played college football at the University of Miami.

Early years
Johnson attended Carrick High School, where he played as a running back. He accepted a football scholarship from the University of Miami. During his first years, he was tried at different positions, including halfback. In his last two seasons he also was the team's punter.

As a senior, he settled as a two-way player at offensive end and defensive back, becoming a starter for the first time in his college career. He was second on the team with 8 receptions for 98 yards (12.3-yard avg.) and 2 receiving touchdowns.

In 2004, he was inducted into the University of Miami Sports Hall of Fame.

Professional career
Johnson was selected by the Chicago Bears in the fourth round (49th overall) of the 1957 NFL Draft. As a rookie, he had 4 interceptions and 11 punts for 398 yards (36.2-yard average). 

In 1958, he tallied one interception and 18 punts for 627 yards (34.8-yard average). In 1959, he only appeared in 6 games (all starts), registering one interception and one punt for 32 yards.

He was selected by the Dallas Cowboys in the 1960 NFL Expansion Draft, but was released before the start of the season.

On September 21, 1960, he was signed by the Buffalo Bills of the American Football League and became a part of the franchise's inaugural season. He appeared in 12 games (2 starts) and posted 2 interceptions.

On April 10, 1962, he was traded along with Paul Miller from the Dallas Texans to the New York Titans, in exchange for the rights to defensive end Curt Merz. He was released before the start of the season.

Personal life
On October 18, 2015, he died from dementia and early-stage Alzheimer's disease.

References

External links
University of Miami Sports Hall of Fame bio

1933 births
2015 deaths
Players of American football from Pittsburgh
American football defensive backs
Miami Hurricanes football players
Chicago Bears players
Buffalo Bills players
Dallas Texans (AFL) players
American Football League players
Deaths from dementia in Illinois
Deaths from Alzheimer's disease